HMS Queen was a three-deck 90-gun second-rate ship of the line of the Royal Navy, launched on 18 September 1769 at Woolwich Dockyard. She was designed by William Bateley, and was the only ship built to her draught. Her armament was increased to 98 guns in the 1780s.

Service

Queen fought at the First Battle of Ushant under Keppel in 1778, and the Second Battle of Ushant under Kempenfelt in 1781. In 1794 she fought in the Glorious First of June under Howe, where she served as Rear-Admiral Alan Gardner's flagship. During the battle Queen sustained significant damage, and her commanding officer, Captain John Hutt, was amongst those killed.

For some of the period between 1798 and 1802, she was under the command of Captain Theophilus Jones.

After the Battle of Trafalgar on 21 October 1805, Queen continued in the blockade of Cadiz. On 25 November,  detained the Ragusan ship Nemesis, which was sailing from Isle de France to Leghorn, Italy, with a cargo of spice, indigo dye, and other goods. Queen shared the prize money with ten other British warships.

On 25 October 1806, the Spanish privateer Generalísimo captured HM gunboat Hannah, which was serving as a tender to Queen.

After Trafalgar, the demand for the large three-decker first and second rates diminished. Consequently, in 1811 the Admiralty had Queen razeed to become a two-decker third rate of 74 guns.

Fate
Queen was eventually broken up in 1821, at the age of 52.

Citations

References

Lavery, Brian (2003) The Ship of the Line - Volume 1: The development of the battlefleet 1650-1850. Conway Maritime Press. .
Naval-Art.com HMS Queen. Cranston Fine Arts. Retrieved 30 August 2008.

 

Ships of the line of the Royal Navy
1769 ships